Perungalathur railway station is one of the railway station of the Chennai Beach–Chengelpet section of the Chennai Suburban Railway Network a suburb of Chennai. It serves the neighbourhoods of Perungalathur and Peerkankaranai.

History
The lines at the station were electrified on 9 January 1965, with the electrification of the Tambaram–Chengalpattu section.

Layout
The station has two platforms. The platforms in the station can presently accommodate only 12-car rakes. In 2012, Southern Railway began renovating the station, including expansion of the platforms to accommodate 12-car rakes. There are two level crossings, namely, LC No. 32 on the northern end and LC No. 33 on the southern end, on either side of the station, a few metres away from the platforms. LC No. 32 comes within the Peerkankaranai Town Panchayat limits and LC No. 33 comes under the jurisdiction of Perungalathur Town Panchayat. So the Railways has decided to build a mini platform to accommodate three coaches without closing either level crossings. This would be in use until both the level crossings are replaced by road over bridges.

Traffic
As of 2012, 84 trains halt at the station and about 10,000 commuters use the station daily.

Per a traffic census conducted in March 2006, LC No. 32 witnessed a traffic flow of 861,000 train vehicle units and LC No. 33 witnessed 743,000 train vehicle units.

Developments
In 2011, a road overbridge was planned to replace LC-32. The ramps of the overbridge would descend on the proposed  500-million Eastern Bypass project connecting Velachery Main Road at Rajakilpakkam and GST Road near the station. A pedestrian subway was also planned to replace LC-33.

Accidents
As of 2012, an average of at least five people are killed on the track every month at the station.

See also

 Chennai Suburban Railway
 Railway stations in Chennai

References

Stations of Chennai Suburban Railway
Railway stations in Chennai
Railway stations in Kanchipuram district